Set Fire to Flames was a Canadian instrumental music ensemble consisting of thirteen musicians from Montreal, Quebec. The band was often considered a side project of Godspeed You! Black Emperor, as the two groups shared several members.

History
Set Fire to Flames was initiated by David Bryant. The group released two albums on Alien8 Recordings and FatCat Records, on their own imprint, 130701, which was set up in 2001. The first album, Sings Reign Rebuilder. was released in October that year.  

The ensemble's second album, Telegraphs in Negative/Mouths Trapped in Static, followed in 2003. It was recorded in a barn in rural Ontario; the sounds of the creaking doors and other background noises are heard behind the songs.

Both albums contain brooding, eerie music. Many of the tracks are  minimalist, filled with ambient noise and various other non-musical sound effects, juxtaposed or combined with instrumental music.   Both album cover images display the work of photographer Michael Ackerman. 

A third album was recorded in collaboration with the band Jackie-O Motherfucker but never released. In 2009, a composition from the band's first album was included on a compilation album released by 130701. In 2016, a previously unreleased track was issued on 130701's fifteenth-anniversary compilation Eleven Into Fifteen.

Members

Discography
Sings Reign Rebuilder (2001)
Telegraphs in Negative/Mouths Trapped in Static (2003)
Floored Memory….Fading Location (2009) includes "Steal Compass/Drive North/Disappear"
Eleven into Fifteen: a 130701 Compilation (2016) includes "Barn Levitate"

References

External links
Official Set Fire to Flames website
set fire to flames bandcamp site

Musical groups established in 2001
Musical groups from Montreal
Canadian post-rock groups
Musical collectives
Alien8 Recordings artists
2001 establishments in Quebec
FatCat Records artists
P-Vine Records artists